"Lose My Cool" is a song by American R&B group SWV featuring rapper Redman, released as the third single from their third studio album Release Some Tension. It was unable to chart on the US Billboard Hot R&B Singles chart due to rules in place at the time regarding album cuts, but it managed to appear on the Billboard R&B/Hip-Hop Airplay chart and peak at number 31.

Music video
An accompanying music video was released, directed by Wu-Tang Clan member GZA and Chase Johnston-Lynch.

Track listing
US Promo
 Lose My Cool (Radio Edit) 	4:00	
 Lose My Cool (LP Version) 	4:38 	
 Lose My Cool (Instrumental) 4:24
 Lose My Cool (A Cappella) 	4:36
 Lose My Cool (Suggested Call Out Hook) 0:10

US CD
 Lose My Cool (Radio Edit) 	4:00	
 Lose My Cool (LP Version) 	4:38 	
 Lose My Cool (Instrumental) 4:24
 Lose My Cool (A Cappella) 	4:36

US 12" vinyl
 Lose My Cool (Radio Edit) 	4:00	
 Lose My Cool (LP Version) 	4:38
 Lose My Cool (No Rap Intro) 	4:00
 Lose My Cool (Instrumental) 4:24
 Lose My Cool (A Cappella) 	4:36
 Lose My Cool (No Rap Version) 4:30

UK CD
 Lose My Cool (Radio Edit) 4:00
 Someone (LP Version) 	4:05	
 Someone (Instrumental) 4:55	
 Someone (A Cappella) 	4:52

Charts

References

1997 singles
SWV songs
1997 songs
RCA Records singles
Contemporary R&B ballads
Soul ballads
1990s ballads